Shopping Spree is a 1996–1998 TV game show.

Shopping Spree may also refer to:

 Shopping spree, a period of intensive shopping
 "Shopping Spree" (The Price Is Right), pricing game featured on unrelated TV game show
 "Shopping Spree" (Chowder episode), 2009 episode of the TV series

See also
Spree (disambiguation)